Northwich Victoria Football Club are an English football club based in Northwich, Cheshire. They are currently competing in the Northern Premier League Premier Division. The club was founded in 1874, playing challenge matches organised on an ad hoc basis until the 1877 season, when they entered the Welsh Cup for the first time. The club entered two other competitions (The Cheshire Senior Cup in 1879 and the FA Cup in 1882) before finally playing league football in The Combination in 1890, for which they were founding members. They became founding members of the Football League Second Division in 1892, where the club remained for two seasons, and are the only two seasons in the club's history where they have played professionally and in the English Football League. In the 1894 season, they returned to amateur, regional football when they rejoined the Combination. Two season in the Cheshire League followed until the turn of the century, when Northwich joined the Manchester League in 1900, when they finished as runners-up. Two seasons later, for the first time, they won a league trophy as winners of the Manchester League in 1902. They departed the Manchester League in 1912 when they joined the second division of the Lancashire Combination, finishing 4th in the first season, which ensured their promotion to the first division. In 1919, they became founder members of the Cheshire County League, where they remained until the 1968 season, winning the league just once in the 1956–57 season. Following their departure from the Cheshire County League, they became founder members of the Northern Premier League. In 1979, they founded yet another league, the Alliance Premier League (now known as the Football Conference, where they remained until their relegation in the 2004–05 season. During their time in the Conference, they won the FA Trophy in the 1983–84 season, and finished runners-up twice in 1982 and 1995. They returned to the Conference National at their first attempt when they won the Conference North in the 2005–06 season. However, ongoing financial issues in the latter part of the 2000s saw them relegated twice in two season; in 2009 they were relegated back to the Conference North and then again the following season to the Northern Premier League Premier Division, where they are competing for the current season.

Key

Key to league record:
P – Played
W – Games won
D – Games drawn
L – Games lost
F – Goals for
A – Goals against
Pts – Points
Pos – Final position
↑ – Promoted
↓ – Relegated

Key to divisions:
 Combination = The Combination
 Div 2 = Football League Second Division
 Ch League = Cheshire League
 CL Div 1 = Cheshire League Division 1
 Mcr League = Manchester League
 LC Div 2 = Lancashire Combination
 LC Div 1 = Lancashire Combination
 LC Div 1 (Mcr) = Lancashire Combination Division 1 (Manchester section)
 CCL = Cheshire County League
 CCL 1939 W = Cheshire County League (West) 1939
 CCL 1940 W = Cheshire County League (West) 1940
 NPL = Northern Premier League
 Alliance = Alliance Premier League
 Conference = Football Conference
 Conf North = Conference North
 NPL Prem = Northern Premier League Premier Division
 NWC Premier = North West Counties Football League Premier Division

Key to rounds:
 EP = Extra Preliminary Round
 PRE = Preliminary Round
 QR1 = First Qualifying Round
 QR2 = Second Qualifying Round
 QR3 = Third Qualifying Round
 QR4 = Fourth Qualifying Round
 R1 = Round 1
 R2 = Round 2
 R3 = Round 3
 R4 = Round 4
 R5 = Round 5
 R6 = Round 6
 QF = Quarter-finals
 SF = Semi-finals
 RU = Runners-up

Seasons

Notes

References

Seasons
 
Northwich Victoria